Bernardino is a name of Italian, Hispanic, or Portuguese origin, which can refer to:

Given name 
Bernardino of Fossa (1420–1503), Italian Franciscan historian and ascetical writer
Bernardino of Siena (1380–1444), Italian priest, Franciscan missionary, and Catholic saint
Bernardino de Anaya (fl. mid-16th century), Spanish man who founded the city of Chachapoyas, Peru
Bernardino Baldi (1533–1617), Italian mathematician and writer
Bernardino Bertolotti (born 1547), Italian composer and instrumentalist
Bernardino Bilbao Rioja (1895–1983), Bolivian air force officer
Bernardino Blaceo (fl. c. 1550), Italian painter of the Renaissance period
Bernardino Borlasca (1580–1631), Italian composer of the Renaissance era
Bernardino Butinone (a.k.a. Bernardo da Treviglio)c. 1436–c. 1508, Italian painter of the Renaissance
Bernardino Caballero (1839–1912), President of Paraguay 1881–1886
Bernardino Cametti (1669–1736), Italian sculptor of the late Baroque period
Bernardino Campi (1522–1591), Italian Renaissance painter from Reggio Emilia
Bernardino Campilius (fl. 1502), Italian painter
Bernardino Capitelli (1589–1639), Italian painter and etcher of the Baroque period
Bernardino Carboni (died after 1779), Italian decorator and wood sculptor of the Baroque period
Bernardino Cesari (1565–1621), Italian painter of the late-Mannerist and early Baroque period
Bernardino Ciceri (1650–?unknown), Italian painter of the Baroque period
Bernardino Drovetti (1776–1852), Italian diplomat, lawyer, explorer, and antiquarian
Bernardino Echeverría Ruiz (1912–2000), Ecuadoran Roman Catholic cardinal
Bernardino Fabbian (born 1950), Italian football player
Bernardino Fungai (1460–1516), Italian painter
Bernardino Gagliardi (1609–1660), Italian painter of the Baroque period
Bernardino Gatti (died 1576), Italian painter of the Renaissance
Bernardino Genga (1620–1690), Italian scholar of classical medical texts
Bernardino Halbherr (1844–1934), Italian entomologist
Bernardino Herrera (born 1977), Spanish field hockey player
Bernardino India (1528–1590), Italian painter of the late Renaissance
Bernardino José de Campos Júnior (1841–1915), Brazilian politician, second and sixth governor of the State of São Paulo
Bernardino Lanini (1511–1578), Italian painter of the Renaissance period
Bernardino Licinio (1489–1565), Italian High Renaissance painter of Venice and Lombardy
Bernardino López de Carvajal (1455–1523), Spanish cardinal of the Roman Catholic Church
Bernardino Ludovisi (1693–1749), Italian sculptor
Bernardino Luini (died 1532), Italian painter from Leonardo's circle
Bernardino Machado (1851–1944), Portuguese politician, President of Portugal 1915–17 and 1925–26
Bernardino Maffei (1514–1549), Italian archbishop and cardinal
Bernardino de Mendoza (1540–1604), Spanish military commander, diplomat, and writer
Bernardino de Mendoza (Captain General) (1501–1557), Captain General of the Spanish galleys
Bernardino Mezzastris (fl. early 16th century), Italian painter of the Umbrian school
Bernardino Molinari (1880–1952), Italian orchestra conductor
Bernardino Nogara (1870–1958), Italian financial manager, financial advisor to the Vatican 1929–1954
Bernardino Parasole (fl. 17th century), Italian painter of the Baroque period
Bernardino Pedroto (born 1953), Portuguese football player and manager
Bernardino Piñera (born 1915), Chilean prelate of the Roman Catholic Church
Bernardino Poccetti (1548–1612), Italian Mannerist painter and printmaker
Bernardino da Polenta (lord of Cervia, died 1313), lord of Cervia, Emilia-Romagna 1297–1313
Bernardino I da Polenta (died 1359), lord of Ravenna and Cervia 1346–1359
Bernardino II da Polenta (fl. died 1400), lord of Ravenna, Italy 1389–1400
Bernardino Radi (c. 16th century), Italian engraver and architect
Bernardino Ramazzini (1633–1714), Italian physician
Bernardino Realino (1530–1616), Italian Jesuit priest; canonized in 1947
Bernardino de Rebolledo (1597–1676), Spanish poet, soldier, and diplomat
Bernardino Rivadavia (1780–1845), first president of Argentina 1826–1827
Bernardino de Sahagún (1499–1590), Spanish Franciscan missionary to the Aztec (Nahua) people of Mexico, compiler of the Florentine Codex
Bernardino de Sousa Monteiro (1865–1930), Brazilian politician, governor of Espirito Santo 1916–20
Bernardino Spada (1594–1661), Italian cardinal of the Roman Catholic Church and art patron
Bernardino Tamames Alonso (born 1973), Spanish basketball player
Bernardino Telesio (1509–1588), Italian philosopher and natural scientist
Bernardino Varisco (1850–1933), Italian philosopher and a professor of theoretical philosophy
Bernardino Fernández de Velasco, 1st Duke of Frías (1450–1512), Spanish nobleman and military figure during the Reconquista
Bernardino Fernández de Velasco, 6th Duke of Frías (1610–1652), Spanish nobleman and diplomat
Bernardino Fernández de Velasco, 14th Duke of Frías (1753–1851), Spanish nobleman, politician, and diplomat
Bernardino Vitulini (fl. 1350), Italian painter
Bernardino Zacchetti (fl. c. 1523), Italian painter of the Renaissance period
Bernardino Zapponi (1927–2000), Italian novelist and screenwriter; collaborated with Federico Fellini

Surname 
Afril Bernardino (born 1996), Filipino basketball player
Ana Bernardino (contemporary), Brazilian pop singer
Angélico Sândalo Bernardino (born 1933), Brazilian Roman Catholic bishop of Blumenau
Brennan Bernardino (born 1992), American baseball player
Firmino Bernardino (born 1950), Portuguese cyclist
Gabriel Bernardino (born 1964), Portuguese mathematician
Girolamo di Bernardino (fl. 1511–1518), Italian painter of the Renaissance period
Hereiti Bernardino (born 1993), French Polynesian track and field sprinter
Juan Bernardino (1460–1544), one of two Aztec peasants alleged to have had visions of the Virgin Mary as Our Lady of Guadalupe in 1531
Jun Bernardino (1947–2007), commissioner of the Philippine Basketball Association 1993–2002
Pietro Bernardino (1475–1502), follower of Savonarola

See also 
San Bernardino (disambiguation)
Bernardina

Masculine given names
Spanish-language surnames
Portuguese-language surnames
Italian-language surnames
Patronymic surnames
Surnames from given names